Benedetto Barberini (22 October 1788 – 10 April 1863) was a Catholic Cardinal and Camerlengo of the Sacred College of Cardinals.

Personal life

Barberini was born 22 October 1788, the youngest of ten children to his father Carlo Maria Barberini of the Barberini family, duke of Montelibretti and prince of Palestrina who assumed the last name Colonna di Sciarra after the merger of the two families. His mother was Countess Giustina Borromeo Arese. 

As such, Barberini is also listed in some records as Benedetto Barberini Colonna di Sciarra. 

He was the Grand-nephew of Cardinals Girolamo Colonna di Sciarra and Prospero Colonna di Sciarra.

Ecclesiastical service

Barberini entered the Roman prelature and was named domestic prelate to the Pope in 1820.

He was also appointed Relator of the Sacred Consulta of Good Government in 1820 and Secretary of the Sacred Consulta of the Discipline of the Regulars in 1822. 

In 1823 he was appointed Prefect of the Household of His Holiness, a post he occupied for the next five years.

Cardinalate

Barberini was elevated to cardinal (in pectore) in 1826 but was not revealed as such until 1828

He was appointed Prefect of the Sacred Consulta of Ecclesiastical Immunity in 1834, a position he occupied until his death. 

In 1844 he was appointed Archpriest of the Basilica of St. John Lateran.

He was appointed Camerlengo of the Sacred College of Cardinals between 1856 and 1857.

In 1862 he was appointed both Secretary of Apostolic Briefs and Grand Chancellor of the Pontifical Equestrian Orders.

Papal conclaves

Barberini participated in 3 papal conclaves:

The Papal Conclave of 1829 which elected Pope Pius VIII.
The Papal Conclave of 1830-1831 which elected Pope Gregory XVI.
The Papal Conclave of 1846 which elected Pope Pius IX

Death

Barberini died on 10 April 1863. His body lay in state in the church of S. Lorenzo in Lucina. Pope Pius IX participated in his funeral and he was buried in his family's chapel in the church of Sant'Andrea della Valle. 

Barberini was the last surviving cardinal of Pope Leo XII, and the last participant in the conclaves that elected Pope Pius VIII and that elected Pope Gregory XVI.

References

1788 births
1863 deaths
Barberini family
Colonna family